Jones Ralfy Jansen (born 28 April 1992) is an Indonesian badminton player who now represents Germany. He was a former PB Djarum players and has joined that club in 2007. In 2010, he awarded as the best Djarum player. He won his first senior international title at the 2013 Portugal International tournament in the mixed doubles event partnered with Keshya Nurvita Hanadia. He also won the 2014 Finnish and Turkey International tournaments with his sister Cisita Joity Jansen.

Personal life 
His father Joy Jansen is German, while his mother Meity Rumayar is Indonesian. He was born and raised in Indonesia with his elder sister Cisita Joity Jansen who is also a badminton player.

Achievements

Asian Junior Championships 
Boys' doubles

BWF Grand Prix (1 runner-up) 
The BWF Grand Prix had two levels, the Grand Prix and Grand Prix Gold. It was a series of badminton tournaments sanctioned by the Badminton World Federation (BWF) and played between 2007 and 2017.

Men's doubles

 BWF Grand Prix Gold tournament
 BWF & IBF Grand Prix tournament

BWF International Challenge/Series (10 titles, 7 runners-up) 
Men's doubles

Mixed doubles

  BWF International Challenge tournament
  BWF International Series tournament

References

External links 
 

1992 births
Living people
Minahasa people
Sportspeople from Jakarta
Indonesian male badminton players
Indonesian expatriates in Germany
German people of Indonesian descent
German male badminton players